Noel Kennedy (born 1964) is a British born, former Hong Kong international lawn bowler.

Bowls career
Kennedy has represented Hong Kong at three Commonwealth Games; in the fours at the 1986 Commonwealth Games, in the pairs and in the fours at the 1990 Commonwealth Games and the 1994 Commonwealth Games.

He won 14 medals at the Asia Pacific Bowls Championships, including a gold medal in the 2001 singles at Melbourne.

He has won the 1994 singles title and the 1998 & 2007 pairs at the Hong Kong International Bowls Classic.

References

Hong Kong male bowls players
1964 births
Living people
Bowls players at the 1986 Commonwealth Games
Bowls players at the 1990 Commonwealth Games
Bowls players at the 1994 Commonwealth Games